Olu Iwenofu (born 28 September 1981 in Lambeth, London, England) is an English former professional rugby league footballer who played in the 2000s.

He previously played for London Broncos (Heritage No. 375) in the Super League.

Olu Iwenofu also competes in Crossfit as a Masters (over 40 years old) Athlete.

References

External links
 (archived by web.archive.org) Statistics at slstats.org
Statistics at rugby league project.org
London Broncos profile

1981 births
Living people
English rugby league players
London Broncos players
London Skolars players
People from Lambeth
Rugby league players from London
Rugby league wingers